Fürth, von Fürth or Furth is a surname.  Notable people with this surname include:

Charlotte Furth (1934–2022), American historian of China
Ernestine von Fürth (1877–1946), Austrian-Jewish women's activist
George Furth (1932–2008), American librettist, playwright, and actor
Hans G. Furth (1920–1999), Austrian-American psychology professor
Harold Furth (1930–2002), Austrian-American physicist
Herbert Furth (1899–1995), Austrian-American economist
Jacob Furth (1840–1914), Austrian–American entrepreneur
Jaro Fürth (1871–1945), Austrian actor
Meyer Fürth, German writer
Otto von Fürth (1867–1938), Austrian physician, physiologist and biochemist
Peter Furth, bike and transit researcher and professor
Robin Furth, personal research assistant to Stephen King
Victor Furth (1893–1984), Czechoslovakian architect